Kosik (Korean: 코식; pronounced Ko-shik) is a male Indian elephant (Elephas maximus) in the Everland theme park in Yongin, South Korea, who was born in 1990. He made headlines in September 2006 when it was discovered he could imitate the Korean words for "yes" (네), "no" (아니오), "sit" (앉아), "lie down" (누워), and four other words. He makes the sounds by putting his trunk in his mouth and shaking it while exhaling, similar to the way a human whistles with fingers in their mouth. Kwon Su-wan, director of the zoo in Seoul, said: "We plan to conduct further studies with keepers, veterinarians and scientists on whether Kosik understands the meaning of these words as he speaks them."

Like all cases of talking animals, claims are subject to the observer-expectancy effect, which may be a meaningless form of mimicry and which are subject to fabrication for many reasons.

See also 
 Batyr
 Kanzi
 NOC
 List of individual elephants

Notes

References 
 
 Associated Press Article
  
 Kosik speaks at Google Videos 

Everland Resort
Talking animals
1990 animal births
Individual animals in South Korea
Individual elephants